Out of Step may refer to:

Out of Step (television programme), a documentary series made by Associated-Rediffusion in 1957
Out of Step (album), sole LP by band Minor Threat released in 1983
Out of Step (film), 2002 film about an LDS young woman from Utah who moves to New York, New York to pursue and education in dance at New York University
Out of Step, the memoir of Sidney Hook
Out of Step Films (company), 2017 Toronto independent film company.